The following is the complete list of performances by Scottish actress, Karen Gillan.

Film

Television

Short films

Music videos

Video games

Audiobooks

Stage

References

External links

 

Actress filmographies
Karen Gillan